The Shuowen Jiezi Zhu, published in 1815, is a commentary in 30 volumes (juan) on the second century Chinese character dictionary Shuowen Jiezi 說文解字, that was written by Duan Yucai. The book took more than 30 years to write.

References

Bibliography
He Jiuying 何九盈 (1995). Zhongguo gudai yuyanxue shi (中囯古代语言学史 "A history of ancient Chinese linguistics"). Guangzhou: Guangdong jiaoyu chubanshe.

Chinese dictionaries
Chinese characters
History of linguistics
1815 non-fiction books
Qing dynasty literature